Reach for Me is a 2008 American comedy-drama film directed by LeVar Burton. It won the AARP Movies for Grownups' Breakthrough Accomplishment award in 2010.

Cast
The film's cast includes many award winners including Oscar Nominee Alfre Woodard and Golden Globe Nominee Adrienne Barbeau.

Cast list
 Seymour Cassel as Alvin
 Johnny Whitworth as Kevin
 Lacey Chabert as Sarah
 Adrienne Barbeau as Valerie
 Charlene Blaine-Schulenburg as Nell
 Larry Hankin as Elliot
 LeVar Burton as Nathanial
 Alfre Woodard as Evelyn

Production
Reach for Me was the first 4K end-to-end production and the first feature film shot on the Dalsa Origin camera.

Awards and festivals
9th AARP Movies for Grownups Awards, presented by AARP the Magazine
-          Breakthrough Accomplishment

AARP’s ‘Movies for Grownups’ Film Festival (Las Vegas, Nevada)
-          Special Feature

Lake Arrowhead Film Festival
-          Best Feature
-          Best of the Festival

San Diego Film Festival
-          Audience Choice Award – Best Feature
-          Seymour Cassel receives Indie Icon Award

Mill Valley Film Festival
-          Official Selection
-          Seymour Cassel is guest speaker of their prestigious ‘Insight’ Program

Downtown Film Festival – Los Angeles 
-          Centerpiece Gala Selection
-          Seymour Cassel receives The Hollywood Reporter Lifetime Achievement Award

Tallgrass Film Festival (Wichita, Kansas)
-          Centerpiece Gala Selection
-          Seymour Cassel receives Ad Astra Award

Off Plus Camera Film Festival (Kraków, Poland)
-          Press Favorite
-          Seymour Cassel receives Special Tribute

Oldenburg International Film Festival (Germany)
-          World Premiere Gala Selection
-          Seymour Cassel given star on their walk of fame

References

External links
 
 
 

Films directed by LeVar Burton
2008 films
American comedy-drama films
2008 comedy-drama films
2000s English-language films
2000s American films